Electroporation, or electropermeabilization, is a microbiology technique in which an electrical field is applied to cells in order to increase the permeability of the cell membrane, allowing chemicals, drugs, electrode arrays or DNA to be introduced into the cell (also called electrotransfer). In microbiology, the process of electroporation is often used to transform bacteria, yeast, or plant protoplasts by introducing new coding DNA. If bacteria and plasmids are mixed together, the plasmids can be transferred into the bacteria after electroporation, though depending on what is being transferred, cell-penetrating peptides or CellSqueeze could also be used. Electroporation works by passing thousands of volts (~8 kV/cm) across suspended cells in an electroporation cuvette. Afterwards, the cells have to be handled carefully until they have had a chance to divide, producing new cells that contain reproduced plasmids. This process is approximately ten times more effective in increasing cell membrane's permeability than chemical transformation.

Electroporation is also highly efficient for the introduction of foreign genes into tissue culture cells, especially mammalian cells. For example, it is used in the process of producing knockout mice, as well as in tumor treatment, gene therapy, and cell-based therapy.  The process of introducing foreign DNA into eukaryotic cells is known as transfection.  Electroporation is highly effective for transfecting cells in suspension using electroporation cuvettes. Electroporation has proven efficient for use on tissues in vivo, for in utero applications as well as in ovo transfection.  Adherent cells can also be transfected using electroporation, providing researchers with an alternative to trypsinizing their cells prior to transfection. One downside to electroporation, however, is that after the process the gene expression of over 7,000 genes can be affected. This can cause problems in studies where gene expression has to be controlled to ensure accurate and precise results.

Although bulk electroporation has many benefits over physical delivery methods such as microinjections and gene guns, it still has limitations, including low cell viability. Miniaturization of electroporation has been studied, leading to microelectroporation and nanotransfection of tissue utilizing electroporation-based techniques via nanochannels to minimally invasively deliver cargo to the cells.

Electroporation has also been used as a mechanism to trigger cell fusion. Artificially induced cell fusion can be used to investigate and treat different diseases, like diabetes, regenerate axons of the central nerve system, and produce cells with desired properties, such as in cell vaccines for cancer immunotherapy. However, the first and most known application of cell fusion is production of monoclonal antibodies in hybridoma technology, where hybrid cell lines (hybridomas) are formed by fusing specific antibody-producing B lymphocytes with a myeloma (B lymphocyte cancer) cell line.

Laboratory practice

Electroporation is performed with electroporators, purpose-built appliances that create an electrostatic field in a cell solution. The cell suspension is pipetted into a glass or plastic cuvette which has two aluminium electrodes on its sides. For bacterial electroporation, typically a suspension of around 50 microliters is used. Prior to electroporation, this suspension of bacteria is mixed with the plasmid to be transformed. The mixture is pipetted into the cuvette, the voltage and capacitance are set, and the cuvette is inserted into the electroporator. The process requires direct contact between the electrodes and the suspension. Immediately after electroporation, one milliliter of liquid medium is added to the bacteria (in the cuvette or in an Eppendorf tube), and the tube is incubated at the bacteria's optimal temperature for an hour or more to allow recovery of the cells and expression of the plasmid, followed by bacterial culture on agar plates.

The success of the electroporation depends greatly on the purity of the plasmid solution, especially on its salt content. Solutions with high salt concentrations might cause an electrical discharge (known as arcing), which often reduces the viability of the bacteria. For a further detailed investigation of the process, more attention should be paid to the output impedance of the porator device and the input impedance of the cells suspension (e.g. salt content).

Since the cell membrane is not able to pass current (except in ion channels), it acts as an electrical capacitor. Subjecting membranes to a high-voltage electric field results in their temporary breakdown, resulting in pores that are large enough to allow macromolecules (such as DNA) to enter or leave the cell.

Additionally, electroporation can be used to increase permeability of cells during in Utero injections and surgeries. Particularly, the electroporation allows for a more efficient transfection of DNA, RNA, shRNA, and all nucleic acids into the cells of mice and rats. The success of in vivo electroporation depends greatly on voltage, repetition, pulses, and duration. Developing central nervous systems are most effective for in vivo electroporation due to the visibility of ventricles for injections of nucleic acids, as well as the increased permeability of dividing cells.  Electroporation of injected in utero embryos is performed through the uterus wall, often with forceps-type electrodes to limit damage to the embryo.

In vitro and animal studies 

In vivo gene electrotransfer was first described in 1991 and today there are many preclinical studies of gene electrotransfer. The method is used to deliver large variety of therapeutic genes for potential treatment of several diseases, such as: disorders in immune system, tumors, metabolic disorders, monogenetic diseases, cardiovascular diseases, analgesia….

With regards to irreversible electroporation, the first successful treatment of malignant cutaneous tumors implanted in mice was completed in 2007 by a group of scientists who achieved complete tumor ablation in 12 out of 13 mice. They accomplished this by sending 80 pulses of 100 microseconds at 0.3 Hz with an electrical field magnitude of 2500 V/cm to treat the cutaneous tumors. Currently, a number of companies, including AngioDynamics, Inc. and VoltMed, Inc., are continuing to develop and deploy irreversible electroporation-based technologies within clinical environments.

The first group to look at electroporation for medical applications was led by Lluis M Mir at the Institute Gustave Roussy. In this case, they looked at the use of reversible electroporation in conjunction with impermeable macromolecules.  The first research looking at how nanosecond pulses might be used on human cells was conducted by researchers at Eastern Virginia Medical School and Old Dominion University, and published in 2003.

Medical applications

The first medical application of electroporation was used for introducing poorly permeant anticancer drugs into tumor nodules. Soon also gene electrotransfer became of special interest because of its low cost, easiness of realization and safety. Namely, viral vectors can have serious limitations in terms of immunogenicity and pathogenicity when used for DNA transfer.

A higher voltage of electroporation was found in pigs to irreversibly destroy target cells within a narrow range while leaving neighboring cells unaffected, and thus represents a promising new treatment for cancer, heart disease and other disease states that require removal of tissue. Irreversible electroporation (IRE) has since proven effective in treating human cancer, with surgeons at Johns Hopkins and other institutions now using the technology to treat pancreatic cancer previously thought to be unresectable.

Also first phase I clinical trial of gene electrotransfer in patients with metastatic melanoma was reported.  Electroporation mediated delivery of a plasmid coding gene for interleukin-12 (pIL-12) was performed and safety, tolerability and therapeutic effect were monitored. Study concluded, that gene electrotransfer with pIL-12 is safe and well tolerated. In addition partial or complete response was observed also in distant non treated metastases, suggesting the systemic treatment effect. Based on these results they are already planning to move to Phase II clinical study. There are currently several ongoing clinical studies of gene electrotransfer where safety, tolerability and effectiveness of immunization with DNA vaccine, which is administered by the electric pulses is monitored.

Although the method is not systemic, but strictly local one, it is still the most efficient non-viral strategy for gene delivery.

N-TIRE
A recent technique called non-thermal irreversible electroporation (N-TIRE) has proven successful in treating many different types of tumors and other unwanted tissue. This procedure is done using small electrodes (about 1mm in diameter), placed either inside or surrounding the target tissue to apply short, repetitive bursts of electricity at a predetermined voltage and frequency. These bursts of electricity increase the resting transmembrane potential (TMP), so that nanopores form in the plasma membrane. When the electricity applied to the tissue is above the electric field threshold of the target tissue, the cells become permanently permeable from the formation of nanopores. As a result, the cells are unable to repair the damage and die due to a loss of homeostasis. N-TIRE is unique to other tumor ablation techniques in that it does not create thermal damage to the tissue around it.

Reversible electroporation
Contrastingly, reversible electroporation occurs when the electricity applied with the electrodes is below the electric field threshold of the target tissue. Because the electricity applied is below the cells' threshold, it allows the cells to repair their phospholipid bilayer and continue on with their normal cell functions. Reversible electroporation is typically done with treatments that involve getting a drug or gene (or other molecule that is not normally permeable to the cell membrane) into the cell. Not all tissue has the same electric field threshold; therefore careful calculations need to be made prior to a treatment to ensure safety and efficacy.

One major advantage of using N-TIRE is that, when done correctly according to careful calculations, it only affects the target tissue. Proteins, the extracellular matrix, and critical structures such as blood vessels and nerves are all unaffected and left healthy by this treatment. This allows for a quicker recovery, and facilitates a more rapid replacement of dead tumor cells with healthy cells.

Before doing the procedure, scientists must carefully calculate exactly what needs to be done and treat each patient on an individual case-by-case basis. To do this, imaging technology such as CT scans and MRI's are commonly used to create a 3D image of the tumor. From this information, they can approximate the volume of the tumor and decide on the best course of action including the insertion site of electrodes, the angle they are inserted in, the voltage needed, and more, using software technology. Often, a CT machine will be used to help with the placement of electrodes during the procedure, particularly when the electrodes are being used to treat tumors in the brain.

The entire procedure is very quick, typically taking about five minutes. The success rate of these procedures is high and is very promising for future treatment in humans. One disadvantage to using N-TIRE is that the electricity delivered from the electrodes can stimulate muscle cells to contract, which could have lethal consequences depending on the situation. Therefore, a paralytic agent must be used when performing the procedure. The paralytic agents that have been used in such research are successful; however, there is always some risk, albeit slight, when using anesthetics.

H-FIRE
A more recent technique has been developed called high-frequency irreversible electroporation (H-FIRE). This technique uses electrodes to apply bipolar bursts of electricity at a high frequency, as opposed to unipolar bursts of electricity at a low frequency. This type of procedure has the same tumor ablation success as N-TIRE. However, it has one distinct advantage, H-FIRE does not cause muscle contraction in the patient and therefore there is no need for a paralytic agent. Furthermore, H-FIRE has been demonstrated to produce more predictable ablations due to the lesser difference in the electrical properties of tissues at higher frequencies.

Drug and gene delivery 
Electroporation can also be used to help deliver drugs or genes into the cell by applying short and intense electric pulses that transiently permeabilize cell membrane, thus allowing transport of molecules otherwise not transported through a cellular membrane. This procedure is referred to as electrochemotherapy when the molecules to be transported are chemotherapeutic agents or gene electrotransfer when the molecule to be transported is DNA. Scientists from Karolinska Institutet and the University of Oxford use electroporation of exosomes to deliver siRNAs, antisense oligonucleotides, chemotherapeutic agents and proteins specifically to neurons after inject them systemically (in blood). Because these exosomes are able to cross the blood brain barrier, this protocol could solve the problem of poor delivery of medications to the central nervous system, and potentially treat Alzheimer's disease, Parkinson's disease, and brain cancer, among other conditions.

Bacterial transformation is generally the easiest way to make large amounts of a particular protein needed for biotechnology purposes or in medicine. Since gene electrotransfer is very simple, rapid and highly effective technique it first became very convenient replacement for other transformation procedures.

Recent research has shown that shock waves could be used for pre-treating  the cell membrane prior to electroporation. This synergistic strategy has shown to reduce external voltage requirement and create larger pores. Also application of shock waves allow scope to target desired membrane site. This procedure allows to control the size of the pore.

Physical mechanism

Electroporation allows cellular introduction of large highly charged molecules such as DNA which would never passively diffuse across the hydrophobic bilayer core. This phenomenon indicates that the mechanism is the creation of nm-scale water-filled holes in the membrane. Electropores were optically imaged in lipid bilayer models like droplet interface bilayers and giant unilamellar vesicles, while addition of cytoskeletal proteins such as actin networks to the giant unilamellar vesicles seem to prevent the formation of visible electropores. Experimental evidences for actin networks in regulating the cell membrane permeability has also emerged. Although electroporation and dielectric breakdown both result from application of an electric field, the mechanisms involved are fundamentally different. In dielectric breakdown the barrier material is ionized, creating a conductive pathway. The material alteration is thus chemical in nature. In contrast, during electroporation the lipid molecules are not chemically altered but simply shift position, opening up a pore which acts as the conductive pathway through the bilayer as it is filled with water.

Electroporation is a dynamic phenomenon that depends on the local transmembrane voltage at each point on the cell membrane. It is generally accepted that for a given pulse duration and shape, a specific transmembrane voltage threshold exists for the manifestation of the electroporation phenomenon (from 0.5 V to 1 V). This leads to the definition of an electric field magnitude threshold for electroporation (Eth). That is, only the cells within areas where E≧Eth are electroporated. If a second threshold (Eir) is reached or surpassed, electroporation will compromise the viability of the cells, i.e., irreversible electroporation (IRE).

Electroporation is a multi-step process with several distinct phases. First, a short electrical pulse must be applied. Typical parameters would be 300–400 mV for < 1 ms across the membrane (note- the voltages used in cell experiments are typically much larger because they are being applied across large distances to the bulk solution so the resulting field across the actual membrane is only a small fraction of the applied bias). Upon application of this potential the membrane charges like a capacitor through the migration of ions from the surrounding solution. Once the critical field is achieved there is a rapid localized rearrangement in lipid morphology. The resulting structure is believed to be a "pre-pore" since it is not electrically conductive but leads rapidly to the creation of a conductive pore. Evidence for the existence of such pre-pores comes mostly from the "flickering" of pores, which suggests a transition between conductive and insulating states. It has been suggested that these pre-pores are small (~3 Å) hydrophobic defects. If this theory is correct, then the transition to a conductive state could be explained by a rearrangement at the pore edge, in which the lipid heads fold over to create a hydrophilic interface. Finally, these conductive pores can either heal, resealing the bilayer or expand, eventually rupturing it. The resultant fate depends on whether the critical defect size was exceeded which in turn depends on the applied field, local mechanical stress and bilayer edge energy.

Gene electroporation 

Application of electric pulses of sufficient strength to the cell causes an increase in the trans-membrane potential difference, which provokes the membrane destabilization. Cell membrane permeability is increased and otherwise nonpermeant molecules enter the cell.
Although the mechanisms of gene electrotransfer are not yet fully understood, it was shown that the introduction of DNA only occurs in the part of the membrane facing the cathode and that several steps are needed for successful transfection: electrophoretic migration of DNA towards the cell, DNA insertion into the membrane, translocation across the membrane, migration of DNA towards the nucleus, transfer of DNA across the nuclear envelope and finally gene expression. There are a number of factors that can influence the efficiency of gene electrotransfer, such as: temperature, parameters of electric pulses, DNA concentration, electroporation buffer used, cell size and the ability of cells to express transfected genes. In in vivo gene electrotransfer, DNA diffusion through extracellular matrix, properties of tissue and overall tissue conductivity are also crucial.

History
In the 1960s it was known that by applying an external electric field, a large membrane potential at the two pole of a cell can be created. In the 1970s it was discovered  that when a membrane potential reached a critical level, the membrane would break down and that it could recover. By the 1980s, this opening was being used to introduce various materials/molecules into the cells.

References 

Biotechnology
Microbiology
Molecular biology
Gene delivery
Laboratory techniques